General Rey may refer to:

Gabriel Venance Rey (1763–1836), French Army general
Jean-Pierre-Antoine Rey (1767–1842), French Army brigadier general
Louis Emmanuel Rey (1768–1846), French Army general
General Philip Rey, fictional general in G.I. Joe media

See also
General Ray (disambiguation)
General Rea (disambiguation)